The Seremban District is one of 7 districts in Negeri Sembilan, Malaysia. This is where the capital of Negeri Sembilan, Seremban is located.

Seremban District shares a border with Sepang and Hulu Langat Districts, Selangor to the north, Jelebu District to the northeast, Kuala Pilah District to the east, Port Dickson District to the west, and Rembau District to the south.

Government

The newly formed Seremban City Council cover the whole Seremban district. The formation of Seremban City Council was done via the merging of Seremban Municipal Council and Nilai Municipal Council on 1 January 2020.

Administrative divisions

Seremban District is divided into 8 mukims, which are:
 Ampangan
 Labu
 Lenggeng
 Pantai
 Rasah
 Rantau
 Seremban City
 Setul

City areas

Inner Seremban (Seremban city core)

Seremban
Rasah
Rasah Jaya
Rahang
Mambau
Senawang
Temiang
Lobak
Paroi
Bukit Chedang
Bukit Blossom
Seremban 2
Ampangan
Oakland
Bukit Kepayang
Kemayan
Sikamat
Bandar Sri Sendayan
Taman Permai

Outer Seremban

Bandar Baru Nilai
Rantau
Mantin
Sungai Gadut
Labu
Lenggeng
Taman Seremban Jaya
Bandar Seremban Selatan
Taman Tuanku Jaafar
Rasah Kemayan
Pantai
Ulu Beranang
Pajam

Seremban 2

Seremban 2 is a new satellite township about 4 kilometres south-east of the existing old Seremban citt centre. Located on the western side of the North–South Expressway, Seremban 2 is a planned township built on former oil palm estate land. Seremban 2's purpose was to relocate the administrative and business district from the crowded old city centre to a more organised area.

Seremban District administrative offices
Seremban Court Complex.
District Police headquarters
State Fire Brigade headquarters

The RM2 billion township will also sustain a large portion of the population of Seremban through various housing estate projects in and around Seremban 2 such as
Green Street Homes
Sri Carcosa
Central Park
Emerald Park
Garden Homes
Garden Avenue
Garden City Homes
Vision Homes
S2 Heights
Park Avenue

The residents here enjoy many facilities with ÆON Seremban 2 Shopping Centre, City Park, Seremban 2's very own Lake Gardens and comparably less traffic than the town centre.

Demographics

Culture

Food

Seremban is famous for its special delicacies comprising Malay, Chinese, Indian cuisine.

Lemak cili padi. Seremban is also famous for its masak lemak cili padi or called gulai lemak cili api, a traditional Negeri Sembilan hot dish.
Siew pau. It is a type of baked bun with flaky pastry bun and meat (usually pork) filling.
Beef noodles. This beef noodles are the best here in Seremban, and the best beef noodles which can be found in Seremban is located at the main Seremban market in town (Pasar Besar Seremban). 
ABC or air batu campur meaning shaved ice with brown sugar syrup and rose flavouring, corn, beans, and cendol.
Traditional mutton soup
Seremban Laksa

Federal Parliament and State Assembly Seats 

List of Seremban district representatives in the Federal Parliament (Dewan Rakyat) 

List of Seremban district representatives in the State Legislative Assembly

Climate

See also
 Districts of Malaysia

References